Alain Gordon Whyte (pronounced Alan) (born 3 July 1967) is an English musician, songwriter, composer and singer. He was Morrissey's main songwriting partner and guitarist between 1991 and 2007.

Prior to 1991, Whyte previously been in the bands Rugcutters, Red Lightning, Motivators, Born Bad and the Memphis Sinners. More recently, he has written for Madonna, Chris Brown, and the Black Eyed Peas, and others. He won an American Society of Composers, Authors and Publishers (ASCAP) pop award in 2013 for his work as a songwriter on Chris Brown's hit single "Don't Wake Me Up".

Morrissey
Whyte joined Morrissey's band in 1991 after appearing in the music video for his single "Sing Your Life". While playing on the Kill Uncle tour in 1991, Whyte co-wrote eight of the ten songs on the album Your Arsenal which was released in 1992. Whyte played lead guitar live with Morrissey from 1991 to 2004 until he was taken ill and replaced by Jesse Tobias. Whyte never returned to the touring act, but he continued to play on Morrissey studio recordings through 2007, and compose music for Morrissey songs through 2009. Several Morrissey–Whyte compositions were released as late as 2009 after Whyte had left Morrissey's band. It was announced in 2021 that Whyte was working with Morrissey again. Whyte was part of Morrissey's band performing at the Colosseum at Caesars Palace from August 2021 to September 2021. Whyte performed alongside Morrissey throughout 2022 and continues to tour with him into 2023. 

Whyte has co-written and/or performed on all of Morrissey's albums issued between 1992 and 2009: Your Arsenal (1992), Vauxhall and I (1994), Southpaw Grammar (1995), Maladjusted (1997), You Are the Quarry (2004), Ringleader of the Tormentors (2006), and Years of Refusal (2009). 

Whyte returned to co-write and perform on Without Music the World Dies (2023). As of Without Music the World Dies, Alain Whyte has a total of 84 known songwriting credits with Morrissey.

Appearances/songwriting credits 
2009
 Kid Cudi – "Up Up & Away" – Man on the Moon: The End of Day (2009)
 Blake Lewis – "I Left My Baby for You" – Heartbreak on Vinyl (2009)
 Kid Sister – "Daydreaming" – Ultraviolet (2009)
2010
 Kelis – "Song for the Baby", "Carefree American" – Flesh Tone (2010)
 Cheryl Cole – "Raindrops" – Messy Little Raindrops (2010)
 The Black Eyed Peas – "Play It Loud" – The Beginning (2010)

2011
 Chris Brown – "All About You" (Team Breezy exclusive track) – F.A.M.E. (2011)
 Nick 13 – "Gambler's Life" – Nick 13 (2011)

2012
 Madonna – "Love Spent" – MDNA
 Chris Brown – "Don't Wake Me Up", "Remember My Name" – Fortune
 Joshua Radin – "Lost at Home", "She's So Right" (bonus track) – Underwater
 Noisettes – "Winner" – Contact

2013
 V V Brown – "10 Ft. Tall"
 will.i.am – "Gettin' Dumb" – #willpower
 Benny Benassi – "Dance the Pain Away" (featuring John Legend)

2015
 Reece Mastin – "I Don't Love You Anymore" – Change Colours

2016
 Kris Orlowski – "Stars & Thorns" (featuring Andrew Joslyn) – Often in the Pause (Covers & Remixes)

2017
 Lil Yachty – "Bring It Back" – Teenage Emotions

2018
 Nina Storey – "Waiting for You"

2019
 Linney – "All of my Life"

2020
 Jane Sheldon – "Go Quietly"

Songs written for TV
 Gossip Girl – "City Nights", "Martini Lounge", "NYC Streets", "Robot Talk", "At the Club", "Let You Down", "Manhattan", "Steady", "Changing Tides", "Park Avenue", "In the End"
 Chuck – "Jingle Bell Rock (arrangement)", "Joy to the World (arrangement)", "We Wish You a Merry Christmas (arrangement)"
 Without a Trace – "Feeling Fine"

Production/mixing
 Deerheart – "EP" (2009) Producer
 Anya Marina "Whatever You Like (single)" 2009 Mixer
 JoAnna James "Try" EP Recorded in 2009, Released in 2011

Other projects
Setting Fires – Setting Fires was a collaboration between Whyte and Mat Devine. Devine has been the frontman and principal songwriter for alternative rock group Kill Hannah since 1996. The two of them met in the summer of 2009, and Setting Fires was born. They enlisted Dean Butterworth (Good Charlotte) to play the drums, Davey Julson-Rieley to produce, and Joe McGrath (AFI, Green Day) to mix the songs for the EP.
 Johnny Panic and the Bible of Dreams – Whyte played guitar in the band Johnny Panic and the Bible of Dreams (not to be confused with Johnny Panic) who released one single "When I Drink I Love You More" in 1998 then disbanded. The drummer of the band, Hodge arranged for an album to be released on Cherry red/Anagram records in 2006 titled Not Bitter But Bored, which contained three songs that went on to become Morrissey songs: "Irish Blood, English Heart", "First Of The Gang To Die" and "Don't Make Fun Of Daddy's Voice."
Red Lightning – In 2005, Whyte, Milo Todesco and John DiMambro formed Red Lightning. Their live debut came on 30 April in Los Angeles. Soon after, they recorded a full-length album with producer David Newton entitled L.A. Crash Landing. Red Lightning played at the South by Southwest festival in Austin, Texas in March 2006, followed by a string of California concerts. Due to irreconcilable differences, Red Lightning split in January 2007.
The Gazmen with Gary Day, Born Bad, The Memphis Sinners, The Memphis Flash, Crash Action, The Rugcutters, and The Motivators.

Personal life
Whyte resides in Los Angeles, California.  His name is pronounced in the English style, i.e. as if it were "Alan White".

Albums

Morrissey
 Your Arsenal (1992)
 Vauxhall and I (1994)
 Southpaw Grammar (1995)
 Maladjusted (1997)
 You Are the Quarry (2004)
 Ringleader of the Tormentors (2006)
 Years of Refusal (2009)
 Without Music The World Dies (2023)

Johnny Panic and the Bible of Dreams
 Not Bitter But Bored (2006)

Red Lightning
 L.A. Crash Landing (2005)

Solo
 Live at The Hotel Café (2019)

Singles

Morrissey
 "Sing Your Life" (1991) UK No. 33
 "Pregnant for the Last Time" (1991) UK No. 25
 "My Love Life" (1991) UK No. 29
 "We Hate It When Our Friends Become Successful" (1992) UK No. 17 †
 "You're the One for Me, Fatty" (1992) UK No. 19 †
 "Tomorrow" (1992) †
 "Certain People I Know" (1992) UK No. 35 †
 "The More You Ignore Me, the Closer I Get" (1994) UK No. 8
 "Interlude" (with Siouxsie Sioux) [1994] UK No. 25
 "Hold On to Your Friends" (1994) UK No. 48 †
 "Now My Heart Is Full" (1994)
 "Boxers" (1995) UK No. 23 †
 "Dagenham Dave" (1995) UK No. 26 †
 "The Boy Racer" (1995) UK No. 36 †
 "Sunny" (1995) UK No. 42 †
 "Alma Matters" (1997) UK No. 16 †
 "Roy's Keen" (1997) UK No. 42 †
 "Satan Rejected My Soul" (1997) UK No. 39
 "Irish Blood, English Heart" (2004) UK No. 3 †
 "First of the Gang to Die" (2004) UK No. 6 †
 "Let Me Kiss You" (2004) UK No. 8 †
 "I Have Forgiven Jesus" (2004) UK No. 10 †
 "You Have Killed Me" (2006) UK No. 3
 "The Youngest Was the Most Loved" (2006) UK No. 14
 "In the Future When All's Well" (2006) UK No. 17
 "I Just Want to See the Boy Happy" (2006) UK No. 16
 "That's How People Grow Up" (2008) UK No. 14
 "All You Need Is Me" (2008) UK No. 24
 "I'm Throwing My Arms Around Paris" (2009) UK No. 21
 "Something Is Squeezing My Skull" (2009) UK No. 46 †
 "Glamorous Glue" (2011) UK No. 69 †
 "Satellite of Love" (live) [2013]
 "Honey, You Know Where to Find Me" (2020)

† Written by Whyte

Johnny Panic and the Bible of Dreams
 "When I Drink I Love You More" (1998)

Solo
 "The Experiment" EP (2018)
 "A Higher Power" EP (2019)
 "Walking Through The Graveyard" Johnny & The Crypt Kickers (2019)
 "Whyte Christmas" EP (2020)
 "Tell Me" EP (2022)
 "Nothing Lasts Forever" (2022)

Songwriting credits with Morrissey
As of Without Music the World Dies, Whyte has 84 known songwriting credits with Morrissey. Whyte's credits include:

 "Glamorous Glue", "We'll Let You Know", "The National Front Disco", "Certain People I Know", "We Hate It When Our Friends Become Successful", "You're the One for Me, Fatty", "Seasick, Yet Still Docked" and "Tomorrow" from Your Arsenal
 "Billy Budd", "Hold On to Your Friends", "Why Don't You Find Out for Yourself?", "I Am Hated for Loving", "Used to Be a Sweet Boy" and "The Lazy Sunbathers" from Vauxhall and I
 "The Boy Racer", "The Operation", "Dagenham Dave", "Do Your Best and Don't Worry", "Best Friend on the Payroll" and "Southpaw" from Southpaw Grammar – "Fantastic Bird" and  "Nobody Loves Us" (only on remastered version).
 "Alma Matters", "Ambitious Outsiders", "Trouble Loves Me", "Papa Jack", "Roy's Keen" and "He Cried" from Maladjusted - "Heir Apparent", "The Edges Are No Longer Parallel", "This Is Not Your Country"  and "Sorrow Will Come in the End" (only on 2009 re-release).
 "America Is Not the World", "Irish Blood, English Heart", "I Have Forgiven Jesus", "How Can Anybody Possibly Know How I Feel?", "First of the Gang to Die", "Let Me Kiss You", "All the Lazy Dykes" and "You Know I Couldn't Last" from You Are the Quarry
 "I Will See You in Far-Off Places", "Dear God Please Help Me", "The Father Who Must Be Killed", "Life Is a Pigsty", "I'll Never Be Anybody's Hero Now" and "To Me You Are a Work of Art" from Ringleader of the Tormentors
 "Something Is Squeezing My Skull", "Mama Lay Softly on the Riverbed", "When Last I Spoke to Carol", "It's Not Your Birthday Anymore" and "You Were Good in Your Time" from Years of Refusal
 "Good Looking Man About Town", "Don't Make Fun of Daddy's Voice", "Ganglord", "My Dearest Love", "The Never-Played Symphonies", "Shame Is the Name", "Munich Air Disaster 1958", "It's Hard to Walk Tall When You're Small", "Teenage Dad on His Estate", "Friday Mourning", "My Life Is a Succession of People Saying Goodbye" and "Because of My Poor Education" from Swords
 "Boulevard", "Notre-Dame", "Happy New Tears" and "The Monsters of Pig Alley" from Without Music the World Dies
 "Let the Right One Slip In", "There Speaks a True Friend", "Pashernate Love", "Black-Eyed Susan", "A Swallow on My Neck", "Whatever Happens, I Love You", "Have-a-Go Merchant, "You Must Please Remember" and "I Am Two People" are tracks that appeared on B-sides of Morrissey singles.
"Boxers" and "Sunny" are non-album singles.
 "Action Man", "Teresa, Teresa", "When I Was Young", "I Was Bully, Do Not Forget Me", "I'm Looking Forward to Going Back" and "Home Is a Question Mark" are unreleased tracks.

References

External links
 December 2005 Q&A session with Whyte

1967 births
Living people
People from Camden Town
English rock guitarists
English songwriters